John Thomas Dodson III (born September 26, 1984) is an American mixed martial artist who competes in the flyweight division of Rizin Fighting Federation. A professional mixed martial arts competitor since 2004, Dodson has made a name for himself fighting mainly in the Southwest region. He was the winner of the Spike TV's The Ultimate Fighter: Team Bisping vs. Team Miller and competed in Ultimate Fighting Championship where he was a two-time title challenger, competing most recently in the bantamweight division, and is a veteran of the promotion with 9 years of competition.

Personal life
Dodson was born in Albuquerque, New Mexico. He grew up in Albuquerque and later moved to Edgewood, New Mexico, with his family. He attended Moriarty High School in Moriarty, New Mexico. Dodson is half African-American, half Filipino. While attending Moriarty, Dodson competed in track, football and wrestling. In wrestling, Dodson was a two-time state champion, one time state runner-up and four time district champion. Dodson graduated from high school in 2003, and then enrolled at the University of New Mexico while working at a local Chuck E. Cheese's restaurant.

Dodson's mother raised him and his brother, Eric, as a single parent. His favorite Filipino food is Pancit. Dodson has daughters named Delilah Skye and Aurora Rose with his wife Chelsea.

Mixed martial arts career
Dodson began training MMA in 2002 after Chris Luttrell, and Greg Jackson recruited him for his extensive wrestling background. After the first day of training he "fell in love with the sport" and continued to train daily with Jackson.

Dodson competed in a Grappler's Quest and won in the beginner level. Four months later he did another submission tournament, winning that at the intermediate level. Six months later Dodson competed in his first amateur fight. He competed in one other amateur bout before turning pro. Dodson was offered to make his debut in Japan against the number one ranked flyweight in the world, Yasuhiro Urushitani. Dodson lost the fight via decision.

With the lack of fights materializing at flyweight, Dodson began taking fights at featherweight and bantamweight as well. He obtained a 3–2 record before taking a fight against future WEC fighter, Clint Godfrey, winning the fight via decision. With the win over Godfrey, Dodson was selected to be a part of the second season of the Tapout Reality show.

Despite having a 1–1 record under the Ultimate Warrior Challenge promotion, he was awarded shot at the vacant UWC flyweight title at UWC 7. Dodson was defeated by Pat Runez in a highly controversial five-round decision. At UWC 8, Dodson defeated previously unbeaten Jesse Riggleman via unanimous decision.

Dodson was expected to fight at Tachi Palace Fights 9 against Alexis Vila. However, Vila suffered an injury and was forced to pull out of the bout. Vila was replaced by former Shooto champion Mamoru Yamaguchi. Dodson then pulled out of the fight for unknown reasons, and was replaced by Kevin Dunsmoor.

The Ultimate Fighter
In 2011, Dodson had signed with the UFC to compete on The Ultimate Fighter: Team Bisping vs. Team Miller. In the first episode, Dodson fought Brandon Merkt to gain entry into the Ultimate Fighter house. Dodson defeated Merkt in the first round via TKO.

Dodson was selected as a part of Team Mayhem, he was the first bantamweight chosen for the team (fourth overall). Dodson defeated John Albert via unanimous decision in the preliminary round and moved onto the semi-finals.

In the semi-finals Dodson was selected to fight Team Mayhem teammate, Johnny Bedford. After a close first round, Dodson won the fight via KO in the first minute of the second round. The win moved Dodson into the finals. The impressive finish also won Dodson an additional $25,000 for the fan voted "Knockout of the Season".

Ultimate Fighting Championship
Dodson made his UFC debut on December 3, 2011, at The Ultimate Fighter 14 Finale against T.J. Dillashaw to determine the bantamweight winner of The Ultimate Fighter 14. Dodson won the fight via TKO in the first round to become the first Bantamweight winner of The Ultimate Fighter competition. He received an additional $40,000 for winning Knockout of the Night honors.

For his next fight, Dodson moved back down to the flyweight division and was expected to face Darren Uyenoyama on May 5, 2012, at UFC on Fox 3. However, Uyenoyama was forced out of the bout, and was replaced by promotional newcomer Tim Elliott. Dodson defeated Elliott by unanimous decision, generating crowd booing.

Dodson faced promotional newcomer Jussier Formiga on October 5, 2012, at UFC on FX 5. He won the fight via TKO in the second round.

First title shot
Dodson faced UFC Flyweight champion Demetrious Johnson on January 26, 2013, at UFC on Fox 6, becoming the first Ultimate Fighter alumnus to fight for a title post-season 5. Despite knocking Johnson down twice in the second round, Dodson lost the fight via unanimous decision in a bout that earned both participants Fight of the Night honors.

Dodson faced promotional newcomer Darrell Montague on October 19, 2013, at UFC 166. He won via knockout at 4:13 of the first round. The win also earned him his second Knockout of the Night award.

Dodson was expected to face Scott Jorgensen on December 14, 2013, at UFC on Fox 9, replacing Ian McCall. However, Dodson himself was forced from the bout after sustaining a knee injury. Jorgensen instead faced promotional newcomer Zach Makovsky.

A rematch with John Moraga took place on June 7, 2014, at UFC Fight Night 42. Dodson won the fight via TKO due to a doctor stoppage between rounds two and three after a knee he threw late in the second round.

Dodson faced Zach Makovsky on May 23, 2015, at UFC 187. Dodson won the fight via unanimous decision.

Second title shot
A rematch with the Flyweight champion Demetrious Johnson took place on September 5, 2015, at UFC 191. In a completely one-sided affair, Dodson lost the fight via unanimous decision.

Return to Bantamweight
Dodson faced Manvel Gamburyan in a bantamweight bout on April 16, 2016, at UFC on Fox 19, He won the fight via TKO in the first round.

Dodson faced John Lineker on October 1, 2016, at UFC Fight Night 96. The bout took place at a catchweight of 136.5 lbs as Lineker missed weight. He lost the back and forth fight via split decision.

Dodson faced Eddie Wineland on April 22, 2017, at UFC Fight Night 108. He won the fight via unanimous decision.

Dodson faced Marlon Moraes on November 11, 2017, at UFC Fight Night 120. He lost the fight via split decision.

Dodson was expected to face Pedro Munhoz at UFC Fight Night 125 on February 3, 2018. However, Munhoz missed weight by four pounds over the bantamweight non-title fight upper limit of 136 pounds, negotiations fell through, and the fight was cancelled. The fight was rescheduled to UFC 222 on March 3, 2018. Dodson won the bout via split decision.

Dodson's contract with UFC expired after the fight with Munhoz and after listening to offers from various companies, he re-signed a new four-fight with UFC.

Dodson faced Jimmie Rivera on September 8, 2018, at UFC 228. He lost the fight via unanimous decision.

Dodson faced Petr Yan on February 23, 2019, at UFC Fight Night 145. He lost the fight by unanimous decision.

Dodson faced Nathaniel Wood on February 15, 2020, at UFC Fight Night 167. He won the fight via TKO in the third round.

On June 16, 2020, news surfaced that with one fight left on his prevailing contract, Dodson re-signed a five-fight deal with the UFC.

Dodson faced Merab Dvalishvili on August 15, 2020, at UFC 252. He lost the fight via unanimous decision.

On September 18, 2020, it was announced that Dodson was released by UFC.

Post UFC 
Dodson was scheduled to fight his first bout after release on July 30, 2021, at XMMA 2 against Cody Gibson. However, Dodson got into a potentially life-threatening car accident with his family and withdrew from the bout. Gibson knocked out replacement Louis Sanoudakis in 44 seconds. Dodson's bout with Gibson was rescheduled for XMMA 3 on October 23. Gibson won the fight by unanimous decision.

Dodson faced Francisco Rivera on April 2, 2022, at XMMA 4. He won the bout via unanimous decision.

Dodson signed a multi-fight contract with Rizin Fighting Federation and debuted against Hideo Tokoro in a return to flyweight on December 31, 2022, at Rizin 40. He won the bout by knockout in the first round via punches.

Bare-knuckle boxing career

Bare Knuckle Fighting Championship
In June 2022, it was announced that Dodson signed with Bare Knuckle Fighting Championship.

Dodson faced Ryan Benoit on August 27, 2022, at BKFC 28: Ferea vs. Starling. Dodson won the fight via knockout in the first round.

Dodson fought Jarod Grant on February 17, 2023 at BKFC: KnuckleMania 3. He won that via first round knockout.

Championships and accomplishments
Ultimate Fighting Championship
The Ultimate Fighter 14 Bantamweight Tournament Winner
The Ultimate Fighter 14 Knockout of the Season
Fight of the Night (One time) 
Knockout of the Night (Two times)

Mixed martial arts record

|-
|Win
|align=center| 23–13
|Hideo Tokoro
|KO (punches)
|Rizin 40
|
|align=center| 1
|align=center| 1:43
|Saitama, Japan
|
|-
|Win
|align=center|22–13
|Francisco Rivera
|Decision (unanimous)
|XMMA 4: Black Magic
|
|align=center|3
|align=center|5:00
|New Orleans, Louisiana, United States
|
|-
|Loss
|align=center|21–13
|Cody Gibson
|Decision (unanimous)
|XMMA 3: Vice City
|
|align=center|3
|align=center|5:00
|Miami, Florida, United States
|
|-
|Loss
|align=center|21–12
|Merab Dvalishvili
|Decision (unanimous)
|UFC 252
|
|align=center|3
|align=center|5:00
|Las Vegas, Nevada, United States
|
|-
|Win
|align=center|21–11
|Nathaniel Wood
|TKO (punches)
|UFC Fight Night: Anderson vs. Błachowicz 2 
|
|align=center|3
|align=center|0:16
|Rio Rancho, New Mexico, United States
| 
|-
|Loss
|align=center|20–11
|Petr Yan
|Decision (unanimous)
|UFC Fight Night: Błachowicz vs. Santos 
|
|align=center|3
|align=center|5:00
|Prague, Czech Republic
|
|-
|Loss
|align=center|20–10
|Jimmie Rivera
|Decision (unanimous)
|UFC 228 
|
|align=center|3
|align=center|5:00
|Dallas, Texas, United States
|
|-
|Win
|align=center|20–9
|Pedro Munhoz
|Decision (split)
|UFC 222 
|
|align=center|3
|align=center|5:00
|Las Vegas, Nevada, United States
|
|-
|Loss
|align=center|19–9
|Marlon Moraes
|Decision (split)
|UFC Fight Night: Poirier vs. Pettis
|
|align=center|3
|align=center|5:00
|Norfolk, Virginia, United States
|
|-
|Win
|align=center|19–8
|Eddie Wineland
|Decision (unanimous)
|UFC Fight Night: Swanson vs. Lobov
|
|align=center|3
|align=center|5:00
|Nashville, Tennessee, United States
|
|-
|Loss
|align=center|18–8
|John Lineker
|Decision (split)
|UFC Fight Night: Lineker vs. Dodson
|
|align=center|5
|align=center|5:00
|Portland, Oregon, United States
|    
|-
|Win
|align=center|18–7
|Manvel Gamburyan
|TKO (punches)
|UFC on Fox: Teixeira vs. Evans
|
|align=center|1
|align=center|0:37
|Tampa, Florida, United States
| 
|-
|Loss
|align=center|17–7
|Demetrious Johnson
|Decision (unanimous)
|UFC 191
|
|align=center|5
|align=center|5:00
|Las Vegas, Nevada, United States
|
|-
|Win
|align=center|17–6
|Zach Makovsky
|Decision (unanimous)
|UFC 187
|
|align=center|3
|align=center|5:00
|Las Vegas, Nevada, United States
|
|- 
| Win
| align=center| 16–6
| John Moraga
| TKO (doctor stoppage)
| UFC Fight Night: Henderson vs. Khabilov
| 
| align=center| 2
| align=center| 5:00
| Albuquerque, New Mexico, United States
| 
|-
| Win
| align=center| 15–6
| Darrell Montague
| KO (punch)
| UFC 166
| 
| align=center| 1
| align=center| 4:13
| Houston, Texas, United States
| 
|-
| Loss
| align=center| 14–6
| Demetrious Johnson
| Decision (unanimous)
| UFC on Fox: Johnson vs. Dodson
| 
| align=center| 5
| align=center| 5:00
| Chicago, Illinois, United States
| 
|-
| Win 
| align=center| 14–5
| Jussier Formiga
| TKO (punches)
| UFC on FX: Browne vs. Bigfoot
| 
| align=center| 2
| align=center| 4:35
| Minneapolis, Minnesota, United States
| 
|-
| Win 
| align=center| 13–5
| Tim Elliott
| Decision (unanimous)
| UFC on Fox: Diaz vs. Miller
| 
| align=center| 3
| align=center| 5:00
| East Rutherford, New Jersey, United States
| 
|-
| Win
| align=center| 12–5
| T.J. Dillashaw
| TKO (punches) 
| The Ultimate Fighter: Team Bisping vs. Team Miller Finale
| 
| align=center| 1
| align=center| 1:54
| Las Vegas, Nevada, United States
| 
|-
| Win
| align=center| 11–5
| John Moraga
| Decision (unanimous) 
| Nemesis Fighting: MMA Global Invasion
| 
| align=center| 3
| align=center| 5:00
| Punta Cana, Dominican Republic
| 
|-
| Win
| align=center| 10–5
| Jessie Riggleman 
| Decision (unanimous) 
| Ultimate Warrior Challenge 8
| 
| align=center| 3
| align=center| 5:00
| Fairfax, Virginia, United States
| 
|-
| Loss
| align=center| 9–5
| Pat Runez
| Decision (split)
| Ultimate Warrior Challenge 7 
| 
| align=center| 5
| align=center| 5:00
| Fairfax, Virginia, United States
| 
|-
| Win
| align=center| 9–4
| Jose Lujan 
| TKO (punches)
| Duke City MMA Series 2  
| 
| align=center| 1
| align=center| 0:52
| Albuquerque, New Mexico, United States
| 
|-
| Win
| align=center| 8–4
| Jose Villarisco
| Decision (unanimous) 
| Ultimate Warrior Challenge 5
| 
| align=center| 3
| align=center| 5:00
| Fairfax, Virginia, United States
|
|-
| Loss
| align=center| 7–4
| Mike Easton
| Decision (split) 
| Ultimate Warrior Challenge 4
| 
| align=center| 3
| align=center| 5:00
| Fairfax, Virginia, United States
| 
|-
| Win
| align=center| 7–3
| Vern Baca 
| TKO (punches)
| Battlequest 8 
| 
| align=center| 1
| align=center| 3:42
| Denver, Colorado, United States
| 
|-
| Win
| align=center| 6–3
| Zac White
| Submission (rear-naked choke)
| Last Man Standing 2
| 
| align=center| 1
| align=center| 3:42
| Roswell, New Mexico, United States
| 
|-
| Loss
| align=center| 5–3
| Bill Boland 
| Decision (unanimous) 
| Ultimate Cage Wars 7
| 
| align=center| 3
| align=center| 5:00
| Winnipeg, Manitoba, Canada
| 
|-
| Win
| align=center| 5–2
| Jake Long
| TKO (slam and punches)
| Last Man Standing 1
| 
| align=center| 1
| align=center| N/A
| Roswell, New Mexico, United States
| 
|-
| Win
| align=center| 4–2
| Clint Godfrey
| Decision (unanimous) 
| Ring of Fire 27
| 
| align=center| 3
| align=center| 5:00
| Castle Rock, Colorado, United States
| 
|-
| Loss
| align=center| 3–2
| Joe Doherty 
| Decision (unanimous) 
| Ring of Fire 25
| 
| align=center| 3
| align=center| 5:00
| Vail, Colorado, United States
| 
|-
| Win
| align=center| 3–1
| Jared Moreland
| TKO (punches)
| Rumble in the Rockies 2
| 
| align=center| 1
| align=center| 2:55
| Loveland, Colorado, United States
| 
|-
| Win
| align=center| 2–1
| Johnny Velasquez
| Decision (split) 
| KOTC: Socorro
| 
| align=center| 2
| align=center| 5:00
| Socorro, New Mexico, United States
| 
|-
| Loss
| align=center| 1–1
| Yasuhiro Urushitani
| Decision (unanimous) 
| Demolition 041114
| 
| align=center| 2
| align=center| 5:00
| Tokyo, Japan
| | 

|-
| Win
| align=center| 1–0
| Zac White
| Submission (rear-naked choke)
| Desert Extreme
| 
| align=center| 1
| align=center| 3:23
| Socorro, New Mexico, United States
|

Mixed martial arts exhibition record

| Win
| align=center| 3–0
| Johnny Bedford
| KO (punches)
| The Ultimate Fighter: Team Bisping vs. Team Miller
|  (airdate)
| align=center| 2
| align=center| 1:00
| Las Vegas, Nevada, United States
| 
|-
| Win
| align=center| 2–0
|John Albert
| Decision (unanimous)
| The Ultimate Fighter: Team Bisping vs. Team Miller
|  (airdate)
| align=center| 2
| align=center| 5:00
| Las Vegas, Nevada, United States
| 
|-
| Win
| align=center| 1–0
| Brandon Merkt
| TKO (punches)
| The Ultimate Fighter: Team Bisping vs. Team Miller
|  (airdate)
| align=center| 1
| align=center|1:37
| Las Vegas, Nevada, United States
|

Bare knuckle boxing record

|-
|Win
|align=center|2–0 
|Jarod Grant	
|KO (punches)
|BKFC KnuckleMania 3
|
|align=center|1
|align=center|1:41
|Albuquerque, New Mexico, United States
|
|-
|Win
|align=center|1–0
|Ryan Benoit	
|KO (punch)
|BKFC 28
|
|align=center|1
|align=center|0:40
|Albuquerque, New Mexico, United States
|

See also
 List of current Rizin FF fighters
 List of male mixed martial artists

References

External links
 
 

Living people
American male mixed martial artists
Bantamweight mixed martial artists
Flyweight mixed martial artists
Mixed martial artists utilizing Gaidojutsu
Mixed martial artists utilizing boxing
1984 births
Mixed martial artists from New Mexico
African-American mixed martial artists
Sportspeople from Albuquerque, New Mexico
People from Edgewood, New Mexico
American mixed martial artists of Filipino descent
Ultimate Fighting Championship male fighters
American male boxers
Bare-knuckle boxers
21st-century African-American sportspeople
20th-century African-American people